Louis Herthum (born July 5, 1956) is an American actor and producer. Herthum has worked as a stage, television, and film actor, and he has also appeared in national television commercials. He is best known for his recurring role as Dep. Andy Broom on Murder, She Wrote and Peter Abernathy in the HBO television series Westworld.

Early life
Herthum was born and raised in Baton Rouge, Louisiana.

Career

Acting
Herthum started his career as an actor in 1978, performing in local theater, local and regional TV commercials and print advertisements. In 1991, after years of being an unfamiliar actor, he joined the cast of Murder, She Wrote; he played Deputy Andy Broom in 25 episodes of the show's final five seasons (1991–96). Before he played Broom, he played two other unrelated characters, beginning in 1989, his first television roles. He remains close to Angela Lansbury. In 2015, he said in an interview that he saw her steal the show in the play, Blithe Spirit, at the Ahmanson Theater in Los Angeles, California, at the age of 89.

He has appeared in such television series as CSI, CSI: Miami, CSI: NY, NCIS, Criminal Minds, True Blood (joining the cast in 2011 for 7 of its 5th season's episodes), JAG, The Mentalist, Men of a Certain Age, True Detective, Treme, Breaking Bad, and The Gates. He appears in two ongoing television series during 2016. He plays Omar on the Netflix series Longmire, and Peter Abernathy, a host (robot) on the HBO series Westworld. After appearing in a recurring role in the first season of Westworld, Herthum was promoted to main cast in the second season. In June 2021, he joined the main cast on the Amazon Prime Video series The Peripheral.

His film credits include In the Electric Mist, The Curious Case of Benjamin Button, I Love You Phillip Morris, American Inquisition, The Open Road, Tekken, 12 Rounds, Seconds Apart and The Last Exorcism.

Producing
In March 1996, after completing his final episode of Murder, She Wrote, Herthum turned his attention to film production and returned to his hometown of Baton Rouge to produce Favorite Son, his first feature film. Since then, his Baton Rouge-based production company, Ransack Films, has produced five feature films, one feature-length documentary (The Season Before Spring) and one short film ("The Grapevine").

Filmography

Film

Television

Video games

References

External links

1956 births
Living people
Male actors from Baton Rouge, Louisiana
American male film actors
American male television actors
20th-century American male actors
21st-century American male actors
Film producers from Louisiana